Alhambra is an urban village of Phoenix, Arizona.

Location
Alhambra encompasses an area south of Northern Avenue, west of 7th Street, east of 43rd Avenue, and north of Grand Avenue or the Grand Canal.

History 
The community's name was chosen by William John Murphy (1839–1923) to designate one of the four North Phoenix areas he sub-divided.
It was built principally to satisfy the housing needs of a growing population in the aftermath of World War II.
Many of those who moved to the area discovered it when they were stationed at Luke Air Force Base.

Demographics
As of 2010, Alhambra had a population of 127,764 living in an area of roughly 20 square miles, giving a density of about 6,400/square mile. 61.1% of residents were white, 6.6% were black or African American, 3.4% were American Indian or Alaska Native, and 4.1% were Asian or Pacific Islander. 21% of residents were some other race, and 3.9% were persons of two or more races.

See also
 Christown Spectrum Mall
 Grand Canyon University

References

External links
 Alhambra Village website

Urban villages of Phoenix, Arizona
Gay villages in the United States